Parappady is a hamlet in Nitte village, Karkala taluk, Udupi district, Karnataka, India.

References

Villages in Udupi district